Knut Ivar Moe (born July 29, 1960 in Lillehammer) is a Norwegian curler and curling coach.

At the national level, he is a 1997 Norwegian men's champion curler.

Teams

Record as a coach of national teams

References

External links

Living people
1960 births
Sportspeople from Lillehammer
Norwegian male curlers
Norwegian curling champions
Norwegian curling coaches